André Göransson and Marc-Andrea Hüsler were the defending champions but chose not to defend their title.

Luke Saville and John-Patrick Smith won the title after defeating Carlos Gómez-Herrera and Shintaro Mochizuki 6–3, 6–7(4–7), [10–5] in the final.

Seeds

Draw

References

External links
 Main draw

Morelos Open - Doubles
2020 Doubles